Novoalexandrovsk is a town and the administrative center of Novoalexandrovsky District in Stavropol Krai, Russia, located on the bank of the Rasshevatka River,  northwest of Stavropol, the administrative center of the krai. Population: 26,518 (2020),

History
It was founded in 1804 by settlers from Central Russia as the village of Novo-Alexandrovskoye. In 1832, it was transformed into the Cossack stanitsa of Novoalexandrovskaya. It was granted town status and renamed Novoalexandrovsk in 1971.

Administrative and municipal status
Within the framework of administrative divisions, Novoalexandrovsk serves as the administrative center of Novoalexandrovsky District. As an administrative division, it is, together with the khutor of Verny, incorporated within Novoalexandrovsky District as the Town of Novoalexandrovsk. As a municipal division, the Town of Novoalexandrovsk is incorporated within Novoalexandrovsky Municipal District as Novoalexandrovsk Urban Settlement.

References

Notes

Sources

Cities and towns in Stavropol Krai
Populated places established in 1804